Lithium thiocyanate is a chemical compound with the formula LiSCN. It is an extremely hygroscopic white solid that forms the monohydrate and the dihydrate. It is the least stable of the alkali metal thiocyanates due to the large electrostatic deforming field of the lithium cation.

Properties and preparation
Lithium thiocyanate is hygroscopic and forms the anhydrous, monohydrate, and dihydrate, which melts at 274, 60, and 38 °C, respectively. The monohydrate supercools after melting, as it recrystallizes at 36 °C. It is soluble in many organic solvents, such as ethanol, methanol, 1-propanol, and acetone. However, it is insoluble in benzene.

Due to its hygroscopicity, the anhydrous form is hard to prepare. The anhydrous form is usually prepared by the reaction of lithium hydroxide and ammonium thiocyanate, then the water was removed by vacuum, then the resulting solid was dissolved in diethyl ether, followed by adding to petroleum ether to form the ether salt, then it was heated in vacuum at 110 °C to result in the anhydrous salt. The overall reaction is the following:
LiOH + NH4SCN → LiSCN + NH4OH
The ether can be replaced by THF.

Crystallography
The monohydrate has 2 forms, the α form, and the β form; the α form reversibly converts to the β form at 49 °C. The α form has the space group C2/m while the β form has the space group Pnam. More info on its crystallography are listed in the table below.

References

Lithium compounds
Thiocyanates